The 2019 Liberal Democrats deputy leadership election was held in September 2019. It followed the election of the incumbent deputy leader Jo Swinson as party leader in July 2019.

Election rules
Unlike the position of leader, there is no official position of deputy leader within the party constitution. A deputy leader of the Liberal Democrats group in the House of Commons can be elected as a result of a ballot of sitting Liberal Democrat MPs.

Results

The result was announced on 3 September 2019 with Ed Davey elected as deputy leader.

References

Liberal Democrats leadership (deputy)
Liberal Democrats leadership election (deputy )
Liberal Democrats (UK) leadership elections
Liberal Democrats deputy leadership election